Schlotheimiidae is an extinct family of cephalopods belonging to the Ammonite subclass. These cephalopods existed in the Jurassic period.

Genera

 Angulaticeras
 Kammerkarites
 Macrogrammites
 Saxoceras
 Schlotheimia
 Waehneroceras

Distribution
Fossils of species within this family have been found in the Early Jurassic rocks of Argentina, Austria, Belgium, Canada, China, France, Germany, Hungary, Indonesia, Italy, Luxembourg, Madagascar, Mexico, Russia, Switzerland, United Kingdom, United States.

References

 
Psiloceratoidea
Ammonitida families
Hettangian first appearances
Middle Jurassic extinctions